{{DISPLAYTITLE:C26H42O3}}
The molecular formula C26H42O3 (molar mass: 402.61 g/mol, exact mass: 402.3134 u) may refer to:

 Androstanolone enanthate (DHTH), also known as stanolone enanthate
 CP 55,244